The 1927 Boston College Eagles football team represented Boston College as an independent during the 1927 college football season. Led by D. Leo Daley in his first and only season as head coach, Boston College compiled a record of 4–4.

Schedule

References

Boston College
Boston College Eagles football seasons
Boston College Eagles football
1920s in Boston